The following article outlines transport in Kiribati.

Roadways
There are 670 km of highways in Kiribati (1996 est.) of which 27 km are paved in South Tarawa (2001). The longest stretch of road travels from South Tarawa to North Tarawa.

Water transport
Ports and harbours include Banaba, Betio, English Harbor, and Kanton. There is a small network of canals, totaling 5 km, in the Line Islands.
The Merchant marine includes the ships of the Kiribati JMR Group that operates the Coral Sea Shipping Line, which has three ships: Coral Sea number 1, Coral Sea number 2 and Coral Sea number 3. One merchant ship connects, from time to time, the Line Islands (Kiritimati, Fanning and Washington) and makes stops en route at the Phoenix Islands.

Air travel
2 small aeroplanes fly out of the Gilbert Islands, except for Banaba. Beginning in January 2009, Kiribati has two domestic airlines: Air Kiribati and Coral Sun Airways. Both airlines are based in Tarawa's Bonriki International Airport and serve destinations across the Gilbert Islands only. Neither the Phoenix nor Line Islands are served by the domestic carriers. The only served airport by any airline is Cassidy International Airport on Kiritimati. Fiji's national carrier Fiji Airways provides an international service from Fiji's main airport, Nadi International Airport to Cassidy Airport as well as to Bonriki Airport. Fiji Airways currently flies a twice weekly flight from Nadi International Airport to Bonriki, Kiribati.

Airports 
As of 2010, there are 23 airports in Kiribati, of which 4 have paved runways, the only international ones being Bonriki International Airport and Cassidy International Airport. Bonriki International Airport is currently undergoing an upgrade program to bring airport security up to IATA standards - this includes the construction of a fence around the entire perimeter.

See also 
 Kiribati

References

External links